Paul Armand Marcel Gavault (1 September 1866 - 25 December 1951) was a French dramatist, playwright and former director of the théâtre de l'Odéon.

Biography 
He enjoyed a hit with his 1906 comic play Mademoiselle Josette, My Woman which was co-authored by Robert Charvay.

Paul Gavault was a screenwriter for the  production company, working in particular for the films La Grande Bretèche (1909, after Balzac), Joseph vendu par ses frères (1909, codirected with Georges Berr), Le Luthier de Crémone (1909), Le Légataire universel (1909), Werther (1910, after Goethe), Madame de Langeais (1910, after Balzac), Carmen (1910, after Mérimée), Vitellius (1910), L'Héritière (1910), Jésus de Nazareth (1911) and L'Usurpateur (1911), Mademoiselle Josette, ma femme (1914).

He was named director of the théâtre de l'Odéon in 1914.

Works 
 1897 : Le Pompier de service, with Victor de Cottens, Théâtre des Variétés  
 1898 : Les Petites Barnett, with Louis Varney, Théâtre des Variétés    
 1900 : Moins cinq..., with Georges Berr, Théâtre du Palais-Royal
 1901 : L'Inconnue, with Georges Berr, Théâtre du Palais-Royal
 1901 : Madame Flirt, with Georges Berr, Théâtre de l'Athénée
 1902 : Les Aventures du capitaine Corcoran, with Georges Berr and Adrien Vély, Théâtre du Châtelet
 1903 : Paris aux Variétés, Théâtre des Variétés  
 1903 : L'Enfant du miracle, 3 acts comédie bouffe, with Robert Charvay
 1904 : La Dette, with Georges Berr, Théâtre de l'Odéon 
 1906 : Mademoiselle Josette, ma femme, with Robert Charvay, Théâtre du Gymnase Marie Bell 
 1907 : La Dame du 23, with Albert Bourgain, Théâtre du Palais Royal  
 1907 : La Revue du centenaire, 3 acts show with Pierre-Louis Flers and Eugène Héros, Théâtre des Variétés  
 1909 : Monsieur Zéro
 1909 : Moins cinq
 1909 : La Petite chocolatière, Théâtre de la Renaissance   
 1912 : Le Bonheur sous la main 
 1912 : L'idée de Françoise, Théâtre de la Renaissance
 1914 : Ma tante d'Honfleur, Théâtre des Variétés  
 1914 : Le Mannequin
 1925 : L'École du bonheur, 3 acts comedy, Théâtre Daunou
 1933 : Le Paradis perdu, Théâtre de l'Athénée
 1933 : Bezauberndes Fräulein, 4 acts operetta by Ralph Benatzky, based on La Petite chocolatière

Filmography 
La Petite chocolatière, directed by André Liabel (France, 1914, based on the play La Petite chocolatière) 
Mademoiselle Josette, ma femme, directed by André Liabel (France, 1914, based on the play Mademoiselle Josette, ma femme) 
The Richest Girl, directed by Albert Capellani (1918, based on the play La Petite chocolatière) 
The Frisky Mrs. Johnson, directed by Edward Dillon (1920, based on the play Madame Flirt) 
L'idée de Françoise, directed by Robert Saidreau (France, 1923, based on the play L'idée de Françoise) 
Ma tante d'Honfleur, directed by Robert Saidreau (France, 1923, based on the play Ma tante d'Honfleur) 
Mademoiselle Josette, My Woman, directed by Gaston Ravel (France, 1926, based on the play Mademoiselle Josette, ma femme) 
The Chocolate Girl, directed by René Hervil (France, 1927, based on the play La Petite chocolatière) 
The Chocolate Girl, directed by Marc Allégret (France, 1932, based on the play La Petite chocolatière) 
Ma tante d'Honfleur, directed by André Gillois (France, 1932, based on the play Ma tante d'Honfleur) 
 , directed by Georges Lacombe (France, 1932, based on Un coup de téléphone) 
The Miracle Child, directed by André Gillois (France, 1932, based on the play L'Enfant du miracle) 
 , directed by Jacques Séverac (France, 1933, based on Les yeux du cœur) 
Mademoiselle Josette, My Woman, directed by André Berthomieu (France, 1933, based on the play Mademoiselle Josette, ma femme) 
, directed by Walter Janssen (Germany, 1935, based on the operetta Bezauberndes Fräulein) 
La signora in nero, directed by Nunzio Malasomma (Italy, 1943, based on the play La Petite chocolatière) 
, directed by Börje Larsson (Sweden, 1945, based on the operetta Bezauberndes Fräulein) 
Ma tante d'Honfleur, directed by René Jayet (France, 1949, based on the play Ma tante d'Honfleur) 
The Chocolate Girl, directed by André Berthomieu (France, 1950, based on the play La Petite chocolatière) 
Mademoiselle Josette, My Woman, directed by André Berthomieu (France, 1950, based on the play Mademoiselle Josette, ma femme) 
The Charming Young Lady, directed by Georg Thomalla (West Germany, 1953, based on the operetta Bezauberndes Fräulein)

Bibliography 
 « Le nouveau directeur de l'Odéon : M. Paul Gavault », Le Miroir, 10 mai 1914
 Christian Genty, Histoire du Théâtre national de l'Odéon : journal de bord, 1782-1982, Fischbacher, Paris, 1982, 320 p.

External links 

 

19th-century French dramatists and playwrights
20th-century French dramatists and playwrights
20th-century French screenwriters
Theatre directors from Paris
1866 births
1951 deaths